Battery is a criminal offense involving unlawful physical contact, distinct from assault which is the act of creating apprehension of such contact.

Battery is a specific common law offense, although the term is used more generally to refer to any unlawful offensive physical contact with another person. Battery is defined at American common law as "any unlawful and or unwanted touching of the person of another by the aggressor, or by a substance put in motion by them". In more severe cases, and for all types in some jurisdictions, it is chiefly defined by statutory wording. Assessment of the severity of a battery is determined by local law.

Generally 
Specific rules regarding battery vary among different jurisdictions, but some elements remain constant across jurisdictions. Battery generally requires that:

 an offensive touch or contact is made upon the victim, instigated by the actor; and
 the actor intends or knows that their action will cause the offensive touching.

Under the US Model Penal Code and in some jurisdictions, there is battery when the actor acts recklessly without specific intent of causing an offensive contact. Battery is typically classified as either simple or aggravated. Although battery typically occurs in the context of physical altercations, it may also occur under other circumstances, such as in medical cases where a doctor performs a non-consented medical procedure.

Specific countries

Canada 

Battery is not defined in the Canadian Criminal Code. Instead, the Code has an  offense of assault, and assault causing bodily harm.

England and Wales 
Battery is a common law offence within England and Wales.

As with the majority of offences in the UK, it has two elements:
 Actus reus: The defendant unlawfully touched or applied force to the victim
 Mens rea: The defendant intended or was reckless as to the unlawful touch or application of force

This offence is a crime against autonomy, with more violent crimes such as ABH and GBH being statutory offences under the Offences against the Person Act 1861.

As such, even the slightest of touches can amount to an unlawful application of force. However, it is assumed that everyday encounters (such as making contact with others on public transportation) are consented to and not punishable.

Much confusion can come between the terms "assault" and "battery". In everyday use the term assault may be used to describe a physical attack, which is indeed a battery. An assault is causing someone to apprehend that they will be the victim of a battery. This issue is so prevalent that the crime of sexual assault would be better labelled a sexual battery. This confusion stems from the fact that both assault and battery can be referred to as common assault. In practice, if charged with such an offence, the wording will read "assault by beating", but this means the same as "battery".

There is no separate offence for a battery relating to domestic violence; however, the introduction of the crime of "controlling or coercive behaviour in an intimate or family relationship" in section 76 of the Serious Crime Act 2015 has given rise to new sentencing guidelines that take into account significant aggravating factors such as abuse of trust, resulting in potentially longer sentences for acts of battery within the context of domestic violence.

Whether it is a statutory offence 

In DPP v Taylor, DPP v Little, it was held that battery is a statutory offence, contrary to section 39 of the Criminal Justice Act 1988. This decision was criticised in Haystead v DPP where the Divisional court expressed the obiter opinion that battery remains a common law offence.

Therefore, whilst it may be a better view that battery and assault have statutory penalties, rather than being statutory offences, it is still the case that until review by a higher court, DPP v Little is the preferred authority.

Mode of trial and sentence 

In England and Wales, battery is a summary offence under section 39 of the Criminal Justice Act 1988. However, by virtue of section 40, it can be tried on indictment where another indictable offence is also charged which is founded on the same facts or together with which it forms part of a series of offences of similar character. Where it is tried on indictment a Crown Court has no greater powers of sentencing than a magistrates' court would.

It is punishable with imprisonment for a term not exceeding six months, or a fine not exceeding level 5 on the standard scale, or both.

Russia 
There is an offence which could be (loosely) described as battery in Russia. Article 116 of the Russian Criminal Code provides that battery or similar violent actions which cause pain are an offence.

Scotland 
There is no distinct offence of battery in Scotland. The offence of assault includes acts that could be described as battery.

United States 

In the United States, criminal battery, or simple battery, is the use of force against another, resulting in harmful or offensive contact, including sexual contact. At common law, simple battery is a misdemeanor. The prosecutor must prove all three elements beyond a reasonable doubt:

 an unlawful application of force
 to the person of another
 resulting in either bodily injury or offensive touching.

The common-law elements serve as a basic template, but individual jurisdictions may alter them, and they may vary slightly from state to state.

Under modern statutory schemes, battery is often divided into grades that determine the severity of punishment. For example:
 Simple battery may include any form of non-consensual harmful or insulting contact, regardless of the injury caused. Criminal battery requires intent to inflict an injury on another.
 Sexual battery may be defined as non-consensual touching of the intimate parts of another. At least in Florida, "Sexual battery means oral, anal, or vaginal penetration by, or union with, the sexual organ of another or the anal or vaginal penetration of another by any other object": See section 794.011.
 Family-violence battery may be limited in its scope between persons within a certain degree of relationship: statutes for this offense have been enacted in response to increasing awareness of the problem of domestic violence.
 Aggravated battery generally is seen as a serious offense of felony grade. Aggravated battery charges may occur when a battery causes serious bodily injury or permanent disfigurement. As a successor to the common law crime of mayhem, this is sometimes subsumed in the definition of assault. In Florida, aggravated battery is the intentional infliction of great bodily harm and is a second-degree felony, whereas battery that unintentionally causes great bodily harm is considered a third-degree felony.

Kansas 

In the state of Kansas, battery is defined as follows:

Battery.
(a) Battery is:
(1) Knowingly or recklessly causing bodily harm to another person; or
(2) knowingly causing physical contact with another person when done in a rude, insulting, or angry manner.

Louisiana 

The law on battery in Louisiana reads:

§ 33.  Battery defined:
Battery is the intentional use of force or violence upon the person of another; or the intentional administration of a poison or other noxious liquid or substance to another.

Jurisdictional differences 

In some jurisdictions, battery has recently been constructed to include directing bodily secretions (i.e., spitting) at another person without their permission. Some of those jurisdictions automatically elevate such a battery to the charge of aggravated battery. In some jurisdictions, the charge of criminal battery also requires evidence of a mental state (mens rea). The terminology used to refer to a particular offense can also vary by jurisdiction. Some jurisdictions, such as New York, refer to what, under the common law, would be battery as assault, and then use another term for the crime that would have been assault, such as menacing.

Distinction between battery and assault 

A typical overt behavior of an assault is Person A chasing Person B and swinging a fist toward their head. That for battery is A striking B.

Battery requires:
 a volitional act, that
 results in a harmful or offensive contact with another person, and
 is committed for the purpose of causing a harmful or offensive contact or under circumstances that render such contact substantially certain to occur or with a reckless disregard as to whether such contact will result.

Assault, where rooted on English law, is an attempted battery or the act of intentionally placing a person in apprehension of a harmful or offensive contact with their person.  Elsewhere it is often similarly worded as the threat of violence to a person while aggravated assault is the threat with the clear and present ability and willingness to carry it out.  Aggravated battery is, typically, offensive touching without a tool or weapon with attempt to harm or restrain.

See also
 Assault (tort)
 Assault occasioning actual bodily harm
 Battery (tort)
 
 Non-fatal offences against the person in English law
 Right of self-defense

References 

Common law offences in England and Wales
Crimes
Criminology
Offences against the person
Violence